Kintsugi is the eighth studio album by American indie rock band Death Cab for Cutie, released on March 31, 2015, on Atlantic Records. Recorded at Eldorado Recording Studios, in Burbank, California, Kintsugi is produced by Rich Costey, and is the first Death Cab for Cutie album to feature an outside producer. The album was nominated for Best Rock Album at the 58th Grammy Awards.

During the production of the album, lead guitarist and founding member Chris Walla announced that he was leaving the band, though he continued contributing to the recording and creative process as a full member until the album's completion.

Production
The band first hinted that they were working on a follow-up to 2011's Codes and Keys by posting several photos of their studio and recording equipment to Instagram in October 2013. In October 2014, the band spoke to Stereogum about their then-untitled eighth album, their experience working with an outside producer, and Walla's departure.

The album title is derived from kintsugi, a type of Japanese art involving fixing broken pottery, and as a philosophy of treating breakage and repair as part of the history of an object, rather than something to disguise.

Release
The album's title, track listing, and artwork were revealed via social media on January 12, 2015, with the song "Black Sun" to be released as the lead single from the album. The songs "Black Sun", "The Ghosts of Beverly Drive", and "No Room in Frame", received their live debut during a performance at The Crocodile in Seattle on January 20, 2015, two months prior to the album's release. Black Sun was officially released on January 26, 2015, following several weeks of snippets of lyrics being posted on various social media sites and the official website.

Critical reception

Kintsugi has received mostly positive reviews from music critics. At Metacritic, which assigns a rating determined by a "weighted average" of reviews from mainstream critics, the album received a score of 67 out of 100, based on 30 reviews, indicating "generally favorable reviews."

In a three and a half out of five star review, Stephen Thomas Erlewine of AllMusic claims: "Most of Kintsugi shimmers upon a gloss constructed out of new wave remnants and faded memories of yacht rock." Writing for Consequence of Sound and giving the album a "C−" rating, Philip Cosores states: "There are moments of radio-ready bliss, a few songs with lyrics that slowly become affecting, a handful of forgettable diversions, and some expected trite, misguided nonsense." Lanre Bakare of The Guardian gave the album three stars out of five and writes: "Sometimes it’s too overwrought and wanders into clichéd territory." Writing for Exclaim!, James Smith felt that "Kintsugi...is a return to form for the band," citing an extra dimension added by blending "lush arrangements...with electronic flourishes" though "the band takes these new elements too far, with underwhelming results."

Accolades

Track listing
All songs written by Benjamin Gibbard, except where noted.

Personnel
Credits adapted from AllMusic:

Death Cab for Cutie
Benjamin Gibbard – guitar, vocals
Nicholas Harmer – bass guitar
Jason McGerr – drums, percussion
Chris Walla – guitar, keyboard, backing vocals

Production
Christopher Possanza – producer
Martin Cooke – engineer
Rich Costey – engineer, mixing, producer
Nicolas Fournier – engineer
Mario Borgatta – assistant engineer
Bob Ludwig – mastering
Josh Rosenfeld – producer
Joe Rudko – cover art

Commercial performance
Kintsugi debuted at No. 8 on the US Billboard 200 chart, selling 56,000 copies in its first week. It's the fourth Death Cab for Cutie album to enter the Billboard 200's top 10. In Canada, the album debuted at No. 5 on the Canadian Albums Chart, selling 4,800 copies.

Charts

Weekly charts

Year-end charts

Release history
Source: Amazon.com

References

2015 albums
Atlantic Records albums
Death Cab for Cutie albums